Specters is a 1987 Italian horror film directed by Marcello Avallone and starring Donald Pleasence.

Plot

During excavations for the Rome Metro, the collapse of a wall brings to light an underground necropolis. Four archaeologists, Lasky, Barbara, Marcus and Andrea, in search of the unidentified Tomb of Domitian, become victims of evil forces in the tomb.

Cast

Production
Specters was the fourth feature film for director Marcello Avallone. His third film Cugine mie had been released a decade prior. Avallone decided to work in horror films when in the United States in 1980.  Avallone began work on the project through the help of producer Maurizio Tedesco, the brother of actress Paola Tedesco, and began to develop a horror film aimed at foreign markets.

Avallone worked on the script with Andrea Purgatori, a reporter for Corriere della Sera newspaper. Despite his name being featured in the credits, Dardano Sacchetti's work on the film was small, with Sacchetti explaining that the writers really believed in the script but the financiers behind it were not as confident and hired him as a script doctor. Sacchetti and the rest of the writers discussed the film for a week but he later recollected that the other writers told him "We're paying you all your fee but leave us our movie."

Specters was shot in nine weeks and shot in English. Among the cast was John Pepper who had worked as an assistant director on films such as The World According to Garp and Ghostbusters. 
Pepper was predominantly chosen for the role for his fluency in English, and this was his only leading acting role.

Release
Specters was distributed theatrically in Italy by D.M.V. on 7 May 1987. It received a release in the United States on October 17, 1989.

Reception
A reviewer credited as "Lor." of Variety at the Cannes Film Market on May 12, 1987. "Lor." found the film to be a "disappointing shaggy-dog Italian horror film" that was "technically okay but not delivering any scares and hardly any action until the finale." "Lor." concluded that the film "provides some nice travelling shots through the catacombs but pic is all buildup and no delivery."

In 1989, Michael J. Weldon observed that the plot was "inspired by the excellent Quatermass And The Pit" and that the monster was only "shown for about two seconds". He also commented, "There's a Nightmare on Elm St. bed scene rip-off, and one good part in an otherwise boring movie. Filmmakers are shown making a remake of The Creature From the Black Lagoon."

References

Footnotes

Sources

External links

Italian horror films
1987 horror films
1987 films
1980s Italian films